Teodora Nemanjić (1330 – after 1381) was the despotess of Kumanovo as the wife of Despot Dejan (fl. 1355). She was the daughter of King Stephen Uroš III Dečanski of Serbia and her eldest half-brother was Serbian emperor, Stephen Uroš IV Dušan. She was the mother of two sons, Constantine Dragaš and Jovan Dragaš, and one daughter. She later became a nun adopting the name Evdokija (Евдокија, gr. Eudokia), hence she is known in historiography as Teodora-Evdokija (Теодора-Евдокија).

Family
Theodora was born in 1330, the youngest daughter and child of King Stephen Uroš III Dečanski of Serbia by his second wife, Maria Palaiologina. Her maternal grandparents were John Komnenos Palaiologos, Governor of Thessaloniki and Irene Metochitissa. Theodora had one full brother, Simeon Uroš and a sister, Jelena; she also had two half-siblings from her father's first marriage to Theodora Smilets of Bulgaria, Stephen Uroš Dušan and Dušica. When Theodora was a year old, at the insistence of the nobility, Stephen Uroš Dušan had their father deposed and imprisoned in chains. He consequently usurped the Serbian throne as Stephen Uroš IV Dušan. Five years later, Theodora's father was murdered by strangulation. Her mother unsuccessfully attempted to obtain the crown for Simeon; defeated in her efforts, she retired to a convent and died in 1355.

Marriage
In 1347, at 17 years of age, Theodora married Despot Dejan. He was granted the title of sebastokrator by her brother, Stephen Dušan. Sometime after her marriage a fresco painting of Theodora was executed at the Serbian Orthodox Christian monastery of Visoki Dečani. Together Theodora and Dejan had three children:
 Constantine (d. 1395), fell at the Battle of Rovine, he had issue with an unnamed woman, married secondly Eudokia of Trebizond, without issue
 Jovan (d. 1378), fell at the Battle of Maritsa,
 Theodora, married 1. Žarko, 2. Đurađ I Balšić

Religious life
On an unrecorded date, Theodora followed in her mother's footsteps and also entered a religious life. Her mother had taken the name Marta, and Theodora, upon becoming a nun, adopted the name Eudokia. In a charter dated 1379, it was recorded that Eudocia imperatrix et filius Constantinus donated property to the Chilandar Monastery.

Ancestry

See also
Eudokia Angelina (Evdokija Anđel), Grand Princess of Serbia 1196-1198

References

14th-century Serbian royalty
Medieval Serbian princesses
14th-century Serbian nuns
1330 births
Year of death unknown
Nemanjić dynasty
Daughters of kings